A Riser Card is a printed circuit board that gives a computer motherboard the option for additional expansion cards to be added to the computer.

Usage

Risers is usually connected to the mainboard's slot through an edge connector, though some, such as NLX and Next Unit of Computing Extreme, have the edge connector on the mainboard instead and have the mainboard plug into Risers. In general, the main purpose is to change the orientation of the expansion cards such that they fit a limited space within casing.

Riser Cables
Riser Cables is an evolution of Riser Cards that utilized improved specifications (specifically the use of PCI Express) and better materials, which allows further distances of data transmission and orientation flexibility than traditional riser cards. These cables used a Riser Card PCB and an edge connector on each side of the cable, with a copper alloy surrounded by a plastic insulator that allows for the further data transmission distances.

These cables are now commonly used in modern household gaming PC's to allow for different positioning of PCI Express Cards and GPU cards in a Computer case. This allows for customization and the addition of additional parts to suit the creator or builders needs. They can additionally be installed into vertical brackets to function similarly to a Riser Card, but with further flexibility. They are also used in small-form-factor PC's to allow for a GPU to be positioned behind a computer motherboard.

Specifications
There are only a few specified standards in regards to Riser designs. The most current one used in an edge connector for data transfer is the PCI Express standard. This allows for maximum data transfer speeds of 32 GB/s when using PCIe 4.0, along with 75W of power to be delivered from the host device. Other specifications used for these cards include ExpressCard and PCI-X.

Applications

Riser Cards have applications in both industrial and consumer spaces.

Industrial
In servers, height for expansion cards is limited by rack units. This is the size limits that Riser Cards must follow when being designed. A unit (U) is the traditional definition or standard for server height and how servers are made. One server unit is equal to 1.75", while 2U servers are equal to a height of 3.5". Traditionally, a 1U Riser Card can fit 1 PCI slot. While a 2U card can fit 2 or 3 PCI slots. This all depends on the size of the expansion card as some are thicker than 1 PCI slot and will cover up any additional slots.

Consumer
In small-form-factor (SFF) computers built by computer enthusiasts, PCI-E Riser Cards are used in a similar sense to a server application. They are used to sandwich a graphics card closer to a computer motherboard and are made to the same heights as server units for most applications. Depending on the case, the more flexible PCI Express Riser Cable is used instead, which can even allow the GPU to be placed "behind" the mainboard, allowing space-efficient orientation without limiting the GPU's airflow.

See also
 Daughterboard

References

External links
 Riser Card Installation

Computer buses
Motherboard
Printed circuit board manufacturing